"I.O.U." is a song from 1983 by British musical group Freeez, their most successful hit. The song was written and produced by Arthur Baker and remixed by Jellybean Benitez and Arthur Baker.

The song was an international hit. The record scored #2 in the UK Singles Chart earlier in 1983 before reaching the top of the Billboard Hot Dance Club Play chart in the U.S., giving them their only chart-topping single on any chart in America. It then became the 20th best-selling single of 1983 in the United Kingdom. "I.O.U." was used for the 1984 breakdance movie, Beat Street. 

In the UK, where clubbing culture had become accustomed to sophisticated jazz-funk music, I.O.U. was seen as "dumbing down" for commercial success, cashing in on the fashionable 'electro' music scene. The accompanying video featured children with skateboards and BMX bicycles recreating New York hip-hop culture for a young audience unaware of the band's previous music. 

During 1986 a 12" single was released in the US by the Criminal Records company, with new remixes. Some of these remixes were given a re-release during 1987 in the UK for the Citybeat label as "I.O.U. (The Ultimate Mixes '87)", however, it only scored #23 in the UK Singles Chart this time.

Samples
The song has been sampled multiple times. Cutfather and Joe used a sample for their remix of Brandy's 2002 single "Full Moon"; Cheryl Cole for the song "Let's Get Down" from her 2010 album Messy Little Raindrops as does Wawa for the remix of StoneBridge's 2007 single S.O.S. Jamie xx uses a vocal sample for the song "Girl", which closes his debut solo album In Colour. In 2019, Detroit rapper Babytron of ShittyBoyz used this sample for the song "Jesus Shuttlesworth", the third track of his debut album Bin Reaper. In 2021 the international DJ/Producer Paolo Pellegrino used the sample and the chorus, and had a new song rewritten together with the singer and songwriter Shibui, also changing the title to Destiny.

Track listings

1983 releases 
7" vinyl
 UK: Beggars Banquet / BEG 96
 Germany, Netherlands: Virgin / 105 535
 US: Streetwise / SWRL-1110
 Australia: Powderworks / POW 0146

 Japan: Victor / VIPX-1742

12" vinyl
 UK: Beggars Banquet / BEG 96(T)
 Germany, France: Virgin / 600 902
 Australia: Powderworks / POWT 0146
 Spain: Beggars Banquet / F-600902
 Canada: Vertigo / SOVX 2327

 UK: Beggars Banquet / BEG 96TA

 US: Streetwise / SWRL 2210 (some with second track on side two)

1986 releases 
 12" vinyl
 US: Criminal / CRIM 00007

1987 releases 
 7" vinyl
 UK: City Beat / CBE 709

 Sweden: City Beat / BB 7105

 12" vinyl
 UK: City Beat / CBE 1209
 France: Virgin / 80291
 Germany: Virgin / 608 897

 Sweden: City Beat / BB 8105

Chart performance

Personnel 
 John Rocca – vocals, hand percussion, bongos, congas
 Peter Maas – bass guitar, vocals
 Everton McCalla – drums, vocals
 Tina B – vocals
 Andy Stennett – piano
 Fred Zarr – piano
 Cosa – bongos, congas
 Arthur Baker – music and lyrics, production, mix, remix
 John "Jellybean" Benitez – mix
 John Robie – mix, remix

additional personnel for 1986/87 versions
 Richard Scher – co-production
 Graeme Durham – editor
 Tim Palmer – editor
 Arthur Baker – remix
 Jay Burnett – remix
 John Rocca – remix
 Latin Rascals – remix
 Raul Soto – remix

References 

1983 singles
1987 singles
Freeez songs
Songs written by Arthur Baker (musician)
Song recordings produced by Arthur Baker (musician)
Beggars Banquet Records singles
1983 songs